Bombina maxima, commonly known as the Yunnan firebelly toad or large-webbed bell toad,  is a species of toad in the family Bombinatoridae found in Yunnan, China and likely to Myanmar. Its natural habitats include swamps, springs, marshes, arable land, canals, and ditches. Although easy to care for, handling a large-webbed toad should be kept to a minimum because their skin secretes a toxin that can cause irritation

References 

maxima
Amphibians described in 1905
Amphibians of China
Amphibians of Vietnam
Taxonomy articles created by Polbot